The 2021 IPSC Action Air World Shoot II will be the second IPSC Action Air World Shoot, and was originally to be held in Sochi, Russia in 2022. However, in reaction to the 2022 Russian invasion of Ukraine, the IPSC cancelled all scheduled and future level 3 and above international competitions in Russia, including this one.

References

External links 
 Match Page: 2018 IPSC Action Air World Shooting Championship 
 Video: The World's First IPSC Action Air World Shoot Recap - RedWolf Airsoft RWTV

2021
IPSC Action Air World Shoot